Roasted chestnut is a popular autumn and winter street food in East Asia, Europe, and New York City. Asian chestnuts (Castanea crenata, C. mollissima) as well as European chestnuts (C. sativa) can be used.

Asia

China 
In China, chǎolìzi ("stir-fried chestnut") is a popular autumn street food. Because they are roasted with sand and sweet syrup, they are also called tángchǎolìzi ("sugar stir-fried chestnut").

Korea 
Gunbam ("roasted chestnut") is a popular street food in both North and South Korea. The food is sold from late autumn to winter by the vendors wearing ushanka, which is sometimes referred to as "roasted chestnut vendor hat" or "roasted sweet potato vendor hat". A popular folk song called Gunbam taryeong ("ballad of roasted chestnuts") was composed by Jeon Su-rin in 1932, and has been sung since, being one of the songs commonly taught in public schools in South Korea.

Europe

Austria 
The Maronistand is a small booth where a street vendor offers roasted Maroni ("edible chestnuts" in local German) and potato-based hot snacks cooked in and on portable metal drums. Such outlets appear in the colder seasons and are a common sight at, for example, Viennese Christmas markets.

Italy 
In Italy roasted chestnuts are most commonly known as caldarroste. They are very popular especially in mountainous areas of the country, such as the Apennines and the Alps where the chestnut grows in abundance. Chestnuts and roasted chestnuts can be found in numerous festivals throughout Italy, usually organized between the end of October and the beginning of November.

Roasted chestnuts are also known by various other names in different parts of Italy:

Basturnòn - Apennines of Piacenza
Biröll, Biroeull - Province of Como and Province of Milan
Boröla - Province of Bergamo
Braschèe, Mundee - North of Lake Como
Brigi - Città di Castello, Umbria
Brostoi - Some areas south of Brescia
Bruciata - Province of Florence and Province of Siena
Brusè - Province of Parma
Brüsatè - Piedmont
Buerie - Friuli
Caciole, infornatelle - Val Roveto, Abruzzo
Callarosta - Vallerano (VT)
Callaròsta - Canepina (VT)
Còculi - Molochio (RC)
Frugiata - Some areas of the Province of Pistoia and Province of Lucca
Maroni, Marroni - Province of Modena and Province of Bologna
Mondina - Garfagnana, Lucca Plain, Versilia, Lunigiana
Mondìgoli, Mandìgoli - Northern part of the Province of Vicenza
Mundaj, Mundà - Piedmont
Mundìne - Val Camonica
Nserta - Northern part of the Province of Cosenza
Pastiji - Some areas of the Province of Reggio Calabria
Pistiddre - Rotonda (PZ)
Pistiddèr - Pollino (southern area of Basilicata)
Riggiola - Northern part of the Province of Cosenza
Ruseddre, Rusedde - Central-western Calabria
Ruselle - Southern part of the Province of Cosenza
Rustìa - Province of Genoa
 Varola - Montella (AV), Irpinia (AV), Melfi (PZ)
Vojola - Soriano nel Cimino (VT)

Portugal and Spain 
Roasted chestnuts are popular street food in Portugal. Called castanhas assadas ("roasted chestnuts") in Portuguese, it is sold around November, when Dia de São Martinho (St. Martin's Day) is celebrated across the country. Traditionally, newly harvested chestnuts are eaten around a bonfire on this day.

In some cities of Spain, during the winter period, portable grills are prepared with the intention of selling the roasted chestnuts in street stalls. In this case, the chestnuts are sold in paper cones (generally made from newspaper sheets). The tradition of the Magosto (roast chestnuts) is a tradition in the Iberian Peninsula.

United States

New York City 
Roasted chestnuts are sold as street food primarily in Manhattan. Though they've been sold regularly for well over a century, the major consumers are primarily tourists, not residents. Once common, they've become less so. They're sold ($3-$4 a bag) starting either at the beginning of autumn, or when the first chill sets in – about the end of September, or early October, until early spring. The few vendors who currently sell them say they mostly sell to tourists around the Christmas holidays.

Gallery

See also 
 Roasted sweet potato

References 

Chestnut dishes
Portuguese cuisine
Street food in China
Street food in South Korea
Street food in Turkey